Old Vojvodina Hotel is a building of the former "Vojvodina" hotel. It is located on the central square, Trg Slobode (Liberty Square), in Zrenjanin, Serbia, next to the famous theatre building.

History
Hotel "Rózsa" was built in 1886 by the projects of Ferenc Pelzl, in neorenaissance. It has two floors and a back yard to the Begej river. After 1918 hotel was renamed to "Vojvodina" and was the best hotel in Veliki Bečkerek. Hotel stayed in this building until 1972, when a new building was built just beside the old building.

Today
After 1972, the building was no more a hotel. Since then, the ground floor became a bank, while the upper floors became offices.

The facade was restored the last time in 2004, when flood lights were installed, so today it is possible to see all its beauty.

See also
 Tourism in Serbia
 National Theatre "Toša Jovanović"
 Theatre building, Zrenjanin
 Finance palace

References 

Zrenjanin
Buildings and structures in Vojvodina
Hotels in Serbia
Hotel buildings completed in 1886